Note: There are other styles and forms of kung fu bearing the name "Hak Fu(black tiger)", but not to be confused with this style.

Hak Fu Mun 黑虎門 is a southern style of Chinese Kung Fu originating from the Shaolin Temple. The style's founder was So Hak-fu, who was one of the famed Ten Tigers of Canton 廣東十虎. The style was opened to the public by Wong Cheung 黃祥 who expanded the system.

History

Forms
三星步 Saam Sing Bo
金剛拳 Gam Gong Keun
夜虎拳 Yeh Fu Keun

Ng Ying Keun
Sup Ying Keun
etc.

External links
 Wong Cheung's Shaolin Hak Fu Mun Society of Hong Kong
Sil Lum Hark Fu Mun Kung Fu
Black Tiger Association

Chinese martial arts